Musaabad (also Romanized as Mūsáābād) is a village in Alvir Rural District, Kharqan District, Zarandieh County, Markazi Province, Iran. At the 2006 census, its population was 79, in 22 families.

References 

Populated places in Zarandieh County